In geometry, the pentagonal cupola is one of the Johnson solids. It can be obtained as a slice of the rhombicosidodecahedron. The pentagonal cupola consists of 5 equilateral triangles, 5 squares, 1 pentagon, and 1 decagon.

Formulae
The following formulae for volume, surface area and circumradius can be used if all faces are regular, with edge length a:

The height of the pentagonal cupola is 
.

Related polyhedra

Dual polyhedron 
The dual of the pentagonal cupola has 10 triangular faces and 5 kite faces:

Other convex cupolae

Crossed pentagrammic cupola 

In geometry, the crossed pentagrammic cupola is one of the nonconvex Johnson solid isomorphs, being topologically identical to the convex pentagonal cupola. It can be obtained as a slice of the nonconvex great rhombicosidodecahedron or quasirhombicosidodecahedron, analogously to how the pentagonal cupola may be obtained as a slice of the rhombicosidodecahedron. As in all cupolae, the base polygon has twice as many edges and vertices as the top; in this case the base polygon is a decagram.

It may be seen as a cupola with a retrograde pentagrammic base, so that the squares and triangles connect across the bases in the opposite way to the pentagrammic cuploid, hence intersecting each other more deeply.

References

External links
 

Prismatoid polyhedra
Johnson solids